Konstantinos Balomenos (born 11 March 2002) is a Greek professional footballer who plays as a goalkeeper for Super League 2 club PAOK B.

References

2002 births
Living people
Greek footballers
Super League Greece 2 players
Super League Greece players
PAOK FC players
Association football goalkeepers
Footballers from Kilkis
PAOK FC B players